The Fiestas de la Virgen Blanca (in Basque: Andre Maria Zuriaren Jaiak) have been celebrated every year, since 1884. It is held on 5 August, but the celebrations begin the day before, on the 4th, and end on 9 August. It honours the patron saint of the city, and features a programme of special events, activities and free open-air concerts.

The actual festivity starts at six o'clock in the afternoon with the txupinazo and Celedón's (a rag doll with an umbrella) descent. Once Celedón reaches a balcony in the square, it is replaced by a human Celedón who then crosses the square on foot with some difficulty amongst the crowds. On arriving to the balcony of the Church of San Miguel, Celedón greets the crowds below and wishes everyone a happy celebration. On the morning of 5 August, the Blusas and the Neskak offer flowers to the Virgen Blanca. On 7 August the Children's Day is celebrated. The little Celedón or Celedón txiki descends in the same square as the first day, and later, Celedón txiki and neska txiki wish a happy celebration to all the children in Vitoria, from the Town Hall. On 10 August at one o'clock in the morning Celedón ascends and this marks the end of the Virgen Blanca Festivities.

History of the Festivities

This festivity has been celebrated since 1884. In 1957, a group of friends created a Celedón's descent, as an analogy to the inhabitants of nearby villages, who went to Vitoria-Gasteiz to celebrate the festivities. The initial idea was a parachutist, but due to technical difficulties they created a rag doll that descends from the Church-tower to a balcony in the square.

The Virgen Blanca Fiesta day by day

4 August

At six o'clock in the afternoon, Celedon's descent is performed from the top of the Church of San Miguel to a balcony in the square below, where Celedón (a rag doll with an umbrella) gradually goes down suspended by a wire. Meanwhile the citizens below, shower themselves in champagne and sing Celedón's song. Once he reaches the balcony the staff hide the rag doll and a human Celedón appears. Next, he has to cross the square, helped by a group of friends, to reach the Church of San Miguel and greet the crowds below and wish everyone a happy celebration. This performance marks the starting of the celebration in Vitoria-Gasteiz.
At ten o'clock at night, the Virgen Blanca brotherhood is in charge of organizing a lantern procession.

5 August
The Virgen Blanca Day is celebrated on this day. At seven o'clock in the morning the dawn procession and the rosary take place. Afterwards, at nine o'clock in the morning a group of friends called the blusas (boys) and the neskak (girls) offer bunches of flowers to the Virgen Blanca Saint and places them at the entrance of San Miguel church

7 August
Celedón txiki. This day is especially focused on children. At twelve o'clock in the morning a recreation of Celedón's descent is made and celedón txiki and neska txiki come down the same way as Celedón did three days before. Children have special activities for them all around the city so they can enjoy the day.

8 August
The veteran blusa and neskas day. This day is focused on the veterans of the city. The streets are bursting with older people dressed in blouses belonging to the blusas from the 60's

9 August

Traditionally the 'dirty' day is celebrated on 9 August. In the parades taking place this day, the blusas and the neskak used to throw flour at each other and danced covered in flour and got very dirty, but nowadays, this tradition is only carried out by a group of blusas called batasuna.

10 August
At one o'clock in the morning, Celedón goes up to San Miguel Church the same way he came down on 4 August. This marks the end of the celebration in the city.

Sports
Every year several traditional basque sports tournaments take place to entertain spectators and increase tourism. The most popular and traditional basque sport is eskupilota and every year the Virgen Blanca Eskupilota Txapelketa Championship is organized and other traditional Basque sports can be followed every morning in the 'Fueros' Square.

Concerts
Concerts are one of the most important highlights these days. Famous local and national celebrities come to Vitoria and perform on stages all around the city centre. The concerts organized by the Town Hall, are normally performed in the squares of 'Plaza del Machete', 'Plaza del Arca', 'Plaza de los Fueros' and 'Plaza Nueva'. But the concerts organized by the Txosnas are performed in the campus of the University of the Basque Country in Vitoria.

Blusas and Neskak

These are groups of boys blusas and girls (neskak) from the city, who take an active part throughout the Virgen Blanca festivities. Most groups are made up of both Blusas and Neskak'. These groups of friends, get together and take part in a parade from the 'Plaza Nueva' to the bullring every day. They also organize different activities around the city centre. All groups have their own identity and are given one of the following names:
 Alegrios
 Basatiak
 Batasuna
 Belakiak
 Bereziak
 Biznietos de Celedón
 Los Desiguales
 Galtzagorri
 Gasteiztarrak
 Hegotarrak
 Jatorrak
 Karraxi
 Luken
 Martinikos
 Okerrak
 Nekazariak
 Petralak
 Turutarrak
 Txinpartak
 Txirrita
 Txolintxo
 Zintzarri
 Zoroak

External links
  Town Hall of Vitoria-Gasteiz (webpage)
  «Celebration ends with Celedón's ascension», Video from EITB(basque TV), 10-08-2010.

Festivals in Spain
Basque culture
Vitoria-Gasteiz
Catholic Mariology
Basque festivals
Festivals established in 1884